The 2007 UEFA–CAF Meridian Cup was the sixth UEFA–CAF Meridian Cup, an intercontinental football competition for the representative under-18 teams of Europe and Africa. The competition, being held as a two-legged tie for the first time, was played in Barcelona, Spain, on 27 February and 1 March 2007. This was the first Meridian Cup under a new format; the two confederations were pitted against each other, whereas in past tournaments individual countries from said confederations competed.

Squads

Africa

Europe

First leg

Second leg

UEFA-CAF Meridian Cup

UEFA–CAF Meridian Cup
Meridan
International association football competitions hosted by Spain